Zambian National Amateur League ZNAL is a Zambian Mixed Martial Arts League Founded by Mixed Martial Arts Zambia in 2022. It is the first ever MMA League in Zambia where individual Athletes compete to gain Amateur experience before turning professional. The ZNAL was introduced to help Zambian athletes qualify to the elite level and to help MMA Zambia come up with a team to represent Zambia at World Championships. IMMAF suggests that each athlete has to win at least 10 fights to qualify to the elite level.

References

External links 

 
 ZNAL event results at Tapology
 ZNAL event results at Sherdog

Sports leagues in Zambia
Mixed martial arts organizations
2022 establishments in Africa